Club Atlético San Martín may refer to:
Atlético Club San Martín de Mendoza
Club Atlético San Martín de Tucumán
Club Atlético San Martín de San Juan